Dariusz Kofnyt (born 28 October 1964) is a Polish football midfielder.

References

1964 births
Living people
Polish footballers
Association football midfielders
Lech Poznań players
Warta Poznań players
Ekstraklasa players